Imants Kukličs (26 March 1938 – 21 January 1994) was a Latvian hurdler. He competed in the men's 400 metres hurdles at the 1964 Summer Olympics in Tokyo, representing the Soviet Union.

References

External links
 

1938 births
1994 deaths
Athletes (track and field) at the 1964 Summer Olympics
Latvian male hurdlers
Soviet male hurdlers
Olympic athletes of the Soviet Union
Athletes from Riga